Chris Rager is an American voice actor who works on anime series at Funimation. His major roles include Mr. Satan in Dragon Ball, Will Powers in Ace Attorney (anime), and Arlong in the Funimation dub of One Piece. In video games, he voices Mr. Torgue in the Borderlands series.

Dubbing roles

Animated films and series English dubbing

Filmography

Video games

Animation

References

External links
 
 
 Chris Rager at the CrystalAcids Anime Voice Actor Database
 
 

Year of birth missing (living people)
Living people
Funimation
American male voice actors
Male actors from Dallas
21st-century American male actors
American male video game actors